Inside the Third Reich is a 1982 television film based on the book Inside the Third Reich by Albert Speer.  It was originally broadcast on network television by the American Broadcasting Company (ABC).

Speer was portrayed in the movie by Rutger Hauer, Joseph Goebbels by Ian Holm, Randy Quaid as Putzi Hanfstaengel, and Adolf Hitler by Derek Jacobi, a role for which he was nominated for an Emmy. The miniseries did win two Emmy Awards for Outstanding Film Sound Editing and Outstanding Directing in a Limited Series or a Special; DGA also outstanding directorial achievement in dramatic specials.

Cast
Rutger Hauer - Albert Speer 
John Gielgud - Albert Speer Sr.
Maria Schell - Mrs. Speer 
Blythe Danner - Margarete Speer 
Trevor Howard - Professor Heinrich Tessenow 
Derek Jacobi - Adolf Hitler
Randy Quaid - Putzi Hanfstaengl 
Stephen Collins - Karl Hanke
Ian Holm - Joseph Goebbels 
Elke Sommer - Magda Goebbels 
Renée Soutendijk - Eva Braun 
Robert Vaughn - Field Marshal Erhard Milch
Viveca Lindfors - Gypsy Woman 
Zoë Wanamaker - Annemarie Kempf 
Michael Gough - Dr. Rust
Mort Sahl - Werner Finck 
Maurice Roëves - Rudolf Hess 
Derek Newark - Martin Bormann 
George Murcell - Hermann Göring 
David Shawyer - Heinrich Himmler
Hans Meyer - Ernst Kaltenbrunner

External links
 

1982 television films
1982 films
ABC network original films
Films directed by Marvin J. Chomsky
American World War II films
Cultural depictions of Adolf Hitler
Cultural depictions of Eva Braun
Cultural depictions of Heinrich Himmler
Cultural depictions of Joseph Goebbels
Cultural depictions of Hermann Göring
Cultural depictions of Albert Speer
American television films
Films scored by Fred Karlin